aka Stroller in the Attic, Edogawa Rampo Theater: Walker in the Attic and Walker in the Attic is a 1976 Japanese film in Nikkatsu's Roman porno series, directed by Noboru Tanaka and starring Junko Miyashita.

Plot
In 1923 Tokyo Lady Minako is the owner of a shabby boarding house with a collection of bizarre characters for tenants. Gōda, one of her tenants, spends most of his time in the attic spying on the other tenants through holes he has drilled into the ceiling. During one of his peeping sessions, Gōda witnesses the murder of one of the tenants at the hand of Lady Minako. Gōda becomes obsessed with Lady Minako, and determines to commit a grotesque murder in order to prove to her that he is her soul mate. He kills another tenant - a priest - by dripping poison into his mouth through the ceiling. A series of grotesque murders follow. The film ends apocalyptically with the Great Kantō earthquake which kills both of them during their intercourse.

Cast
 Junko Miyashita: Minako Kiyomiya
 Hiroshi Osa: Kōichirō Kiyomiya
 Renji Ishibashi: Gōda Saburō
 Tokuko Watanabe: Miyuki Tomita
 Kōji Yashiro: Endō
 Haruka Tajima: Ginko
 Toshihiko Oda: Hiruta
 Shirō Yumemura: Pierrot
 Reiko Akitsu: Model
 Aoi Nakajima: Prostitute
 Kyōichi Mizuki: Druggist

Background
This film was the middle entry in director Tanaka's "Showa Era Trilogy", which includes A Woman Called Sada Abe (1975) and Beauty's Exotic Dance: Torture! (1977). All three films star Junko Miyashita. The story was based on a novel by the Japanese horror-mystery writer, Edogawa Rampo. It had been filmed as a pink film in 1970 by director Akitaka Kimata, and Akio Jissoji remade Watcher in the Attic in 1995 in one of the earliest un-fogged pink films. The uncensored version of Jissoji's film was released internationally, though the Japanese theatrical release of this film was fogged.

Lead actress Junko Miyashita had joined Nikkatsu with the third entry in the Apartment Wife series, Apartment Wife: Unforgettable Night (1972). She starred in several of Nikkatsu's greatest Roman Porno successes, and became known as the second "Queen" of Roman Porno after the retirement of Kazuko Shirakawa. A skillful and versatile actress, her career also benefitted by appearing in films by Nikkatsu's best directors. Besides Tanaka, she was closely associated with the films of Tatsumi Kumashiro.

Lead actor Renji Ishibashi had background in the live theater, and made a name for himself in Roman porno for psychologically unbalanced characters. Besides Watcher in the Attic, another of his major roles is in Tatsumi Kumashiro's Woman with Red Hair (1979), also starring Junko Miyashita. He later regularly appeared in old yakuza roles in the films of Takashi Miike and others.

Themes and legacy
Jasper Sharp notes that director Tanaka portrays the Taishō period, in which the film is set, as "a pandemonium of styles and colours". Tanaka emphasizes the mixture of the erotic and the grotesque in Rampo's work, and in popular culture of the period, which led to its description as "ero guro". According to Sharp, Tanaka's vision of Rampo's world set the tone for later filmed versions of the author's works as well as biographical films. Tanaka's influence can reportedly be seen in Jissoji's 1994 remake of Walker in the Attic, Kazuyoshi Okuyama's The Mystery of Rampo (1994), Jissoji's The D-Slope Murder Case (1998), and in Rampo Noir (2005).

Voyeurism—already present in Rampo's story—is a major theme in the film. Tanaka makes the audience aware that Lady Minako is conscious of Gōda's--and, by extension the audience's--spying on her illicit sexual activities. Sharp writes that the camera views Minako through Gōda's ceiling peephole, "acknowledging the viewer's powerless and passive spectatorial role as she returns our gaze." Sharp also notes that voyeurism is a common theme in the pink film, and that it would be deeply explored in the later films of director Hisayasu Satō. Not only a psychological theme, voyeurism also provided a practical way for the director to obscure sexual organs, which were censored by law. Sharp writes, "Framing the sex scenes from an awkward nozoki point-of-view perspective, through keyholes, gaps in open doors, holes in walls, etc, proved one particularly expedient method of blocking the action."

Critical appraisal
Some critics had recognized Tanaka's talents in the early Roman Porno, Secret Chronicles: She Beast Market (1974), but it was Watcher in the Attic which brought him mainstream success. Peer Cinema Club Annual, a conservative, mainstream publication, wrote that the film was "a perfect marriage of decadence and art." At first treated as a standard entry of Nikkatsu's "Psycho Killer Showcase" series, after the film began receiving mainstream critical approval, Nikkatsu promoted Walker in the Attic beyond the softcore Roman Porno market.

English-language critical opinion of the film has been high in the decades since its first release. Magill's Survey of Cinema: Foreign Language Films (1985) calls Watcher in the Attic "a frenzied fantasy treat".
In their Japanese Cinema Encyclopedia: The Sex Films (1998), the Weissers give the film three and a half out of four points. Jasper Sharp comments that the film shows Tanaka's versatility as a director.

Availability
Watcher in the Attic was released theatrically in Japan on June 12, 1976. It was released to home video in VHS format in Japan on September 9, 1994. As part of Geneon's second wave of Nikkatsu Roman porno series, it was released on DVD on December 22, 2005. 
On October 28, 2008, Mondo Macabro released Watcher in the Attic in the U.S. on region 0 DVD.

References

Bibliography

English

Japanese

External links
 
 

1976 films
Films based on works by Edogawa Ranpo
Films directed by Noboru Tanaka
Films set in the 1920s
1970s Japanese-language films
Nikkatsu films
Nikkatsu Roman Porno
Films based on Japanese novels
1970s Japanese films